Naresh Goyal (born 29 July 1949) is a non-resident Indian (NRI) businessman and founder Chairman of Jet Airways. He started operating Jet Airways in 1993 with initial seed money from Tail Winds incorporated, Isle of Man. He currently does not feature on the Forbes list.

Early life
Naresh Goyal was born in Sangrur, Punjab in 1949 in the house of a jewellery dealer. His father died when he was a child. He studied up to sixth standard at Govt. Raj High School for Boys. When he was eleven years old, his family went through an economic crisis and his house was auctioned. He then lived with his mother's uncle. Goyal holds a Bachelors of Commerce degree from Govt. Bikram College of Commerce, Patiala.

Career
In 1967, Goyal began his career as a cashier in his maternal uncle Seth Charan Das Ram Lal's travel agency, East West Agencies, at a starting salary of Rs 300 a month. After graduating in Commerce, Goyal joined the travel business with the GSA for Lebanese International Airlines.

From 1967 to 1974, he underwent extensive training in the travel business through his association with several foreign airlines. He travelled overseas extensively on business during this period.

In 1969, he was appointed the public relation manager of Iraqi Airways and from 1971 to 1974 was the regional manager for ALIA, Royal Jordanian Airlines. He also worked with the Indian offices of Middle East Airlines (MEA), where he gained experience in various areas including ticketing, reservations and sales. in 1974, with £500 from his mother, he set up his own agency named Jetair, representing the likes of Air France, Austrian Airlines and Cathay Pacific.

In 1975, he was appointed regional manager of Philippines Airlines in India.

Naresh Goyal stepped down from the Board of Jet Airways along with his wife Anita Goyal on 25 March 2019 amid financial crisis in the airline and after two-thirds of fleet grounded.

He was stopped from flying away in 2019

Money Laundering 
In September 2019, the Enforcement Directorate questioned Goyal for investigating charges of foreign exchange violation against him. He was detained and questioned for money laundering by the ED in 2020.

Jet Airways
In 1993, Goyal took advantage of the opening of the Indian economy by the Congress government led by P. V. Narasimha Rao, the then Prime Minister of India and the enunciation of the Open Skies Policy by the Government of India to set up Jet Airways for the operation of scheduled air services on domestic sectors in India. Jet Airways commenced commercial operations on 5 May 1993. Goyal founded Jet Airways (Private) Limited with the objective of providing sales and marketing representation to foreign airlines in India.

Goyal served on the board of the International Air Transport Association (IATA) from 2004–2006. He was re-elected in 2008 with his tenure extending until June 2016. Naresh Goyal stepped down from the Board of Jet Airways on 25 March 2019 along with his wife.

Personal life
Goyal met his wife, Anita, after she joined the company in 1979 as a marketing analyst and rose to become the head of marketing and sales. They married nine years later. The couple together have a daughter and a son.

Awards

References

External links
 Naresh Goyal image
 Jet Airways site Chairman's profile
 Airline Business magazine profile
 Forbes – India's 40 richest
 Takeover link
Jet files a suit of 500 Cr – Agarwal Today Report

Indian company founders
Indian billionaires
1949 births
Living people
Businesspeople in aviation
Jet Airways people
Businesspeople from Mumbai
Indian aviation businesspeople
20th-century Indian businesspeople
Businesspeople from Punjab, India
People from Sangrur